"Bu liao qing" is a Mandarin song variously translated into English as "Love Without End", "Endless Love", or "Unforgettable Love". The song was released in 1961, The music was composed by Wong Fuk Ling, and the lyrics were written by Tao Tseon. The song was first sung by Koo Mei, sister of Joseph Koo, in the 1961 Shaw Brothers film of the same name. This song has been sung by various singers in later years, such as Sally Yeh, Anita Mui, Tsai Chin and Frances Yip.

References

External links 
 Search results of 不了情 at MDBG.net
 
 
 
 

1961 songs
Mandarin-language songs